Maksym Lapushenko (born 19 February 1992) is a Ukraine football defender who plays for Portuguese club Leça FC.

Club statistics
Total matches played in Moldavian First League: 8 matches - 0 goals

References

External links

Profile at Divizia Nationala

1992 births
Footballers from Kyiv
Ukrainian footballers
Ukrainian expatriate footballers
Living people
FC Dacia Chișinău players
Leixões S.C. players
F.C. Felgueiras 1932 players
AD Fafe players
Leça F.C. players
Moldovan Super Liga players
Liga Portugal 2 players
Campeonato de Portugal (league) players
Association football defenders
Ukrainian expatriate sportspeople in Moldova
Ukrainian expatriate sportspeople in Portugal
Expatriate footballers in Moldova
Expatriate footballers in Portugal